Diplodiscus scortechinii is a species of flowering plant in the family Malvaceae sensu lato or Tiliaceae. It is a tree found in Peninsular Malaysia and Borneo.

References

scortechinii
Trees of Peninsular Malaysia
Trees of Borneo
Conservation dependent plants
Taxonomy articles created by Polbot